A Gentleman of Quality is a 1919 American silent drama film directed by James Young and starring Earle Williams, Kathryn Adams, Joyce Moore, James Carpenter, and Robert Bolder. It is based on the 1909 novel of the same name by Frederick Van Rensselaer Dey. The film was released by Vitagraph Company of America on March 17, 1919.

Plot

Cast
Earle Williams as John Ashton / Lord John Hartford
Kathryn Adams as Lady Mercy Covington
Joyce Moore as Hope Hollister
James Carpenter as Harry Hollister
Robert Bolder as Robert
George C. Pearce as Dean Douglas
Ronald Byram as Richard Hertford

Preservation
The film is now considered lost.

See also
List of lost films

References

External links

1919 drama films
Silent American drama films
1919 films
American silent feature films
American black-and-white films
Vitagraph Studios films
Lost American films
Films based on American novels
Films set in London
1919 lost films
Lost drama films
1910s American films